Khomsianeh-ye Pain (also Romanized as Khomsīāneh-ye Pā‘īn; also known as Khomsīāneh-ye Soflá) is a village in Beyranvand-e Jonubi Rural District, Bayravand District, Khorramabad County, Lorestan Province, Iran. At the 2006 census, its population was 142, in 30 families.

References 

Towns and villages in Khorramabad County